The César Award for Best Short Film is an award presented by the Académie des Arts et Techniques du Cinéma since 1992.

Winners and nominees

1990s

2000s

2010s

2020s

See also
Academy Award for Best Live Action Short Film
BAFTA Award for Best Short Film
European Film Award for Best Short Film

References

External links 
  
 César Award for Best Short Film at AlloCiné

Short Film
Short film awards